Irving Township is a township in Brown County, Kansas, USA.  As of the 2000 census, its population was 311.

The first white settlement at Irving Township was made in 1855.

Geography
According to the USGS, it contains three cemeteries: Kenyon, Partlow and Tesson.

The stream of Lost Shirt Creek runs through this township.

References

 USGS Geographic Names Information System (GNIS)

External links
 US-Counties.com
 City-Data.com

Townships in Brown County, Kansas
Townships in Kansas
1855 establishments in Kansas Territory